Moussa Helal (born 30 November 1949) is a former professional squash player from Egypt. He has won many championships, which seeded him no. 8 in the world, and no. 2 in over 35's. He moved to Manchester, England and became a British citizen in 1984 entering the British rankings for the first time. He represented Cheshire at county level before retiring to become a squash coach.
His eldest daughter, Amina Helal, is also a squash player and is a former American Inter-Collegiate squash champion. His younger daughter, Jessica Helal is a successful squash coach in California.

References

Egyptian male squash players
English male squash players
Living people
1949 births